Halki or Chalki can refer to several different things:

 Chalki (also Khalki or Halki), a Greek island in the Dodecanese
 Heybeliada (Chalki in Greek), one of the Princes' Islands near Istanbul
 The Halki seminary, located on Heybeliada
 Chalaki, Golestan, in northern Iran, sometimes spelt Chalki
 Ḫalki, Hittite grain deity.
 Ige-Halki, a king of ancient Elam (mid 14th century BCE).

Not to be confused with Chalcis, a town in Greece.